Salsette Island is an island in Konkan division of the state of Maharashtra, on India's west coast. Administratively known as Greater Mumbai, the city district of Mumbai, Mumbai Suburban district, Mira Bhayander, and a portion of Thane lie within it, making it very populous and one of the most densely populated islands in the world.

Location
Salsette is bounded on the north by Vasai Creek, on the northeast by the Ulhas River, on the east by Thane Creek and Mumbai Harbour, and on the south and west by the Arabian Sea. The original seven islands of Mumbai, which were merged by land reclamation during the 19th and early 20th centuries to form the city of Mumbai, are now practically a southward protruding peninsula of the much larger Salsette Island.

The island of Trombay that was to the southeast of Salsette is today part of Salsette as much of the intervening swamps have been reclaimed. It contains Borivali National Park, also known as Sanjay Gandhi National Park. The city of Thane is at the northeastern corner, on Thane Creek, while the western suburbs of Mumbai which stretches from Bhayandar in the northwest corner to Bandra which lies just before the Mumbai City district lies on its western side while the eastern suburbs of Mumbai that stretches from Thane to Kurla  lies on the eastern half of the island. Both suburbs are separated by the Borivali National Park till the neighbourhood of Powai in Andheri. Politically, the Mumbai City district covers the peninsula south of Mahim and Sion while most of the original island constitutes the Mumbai Suburban district. The northern portion lies within Thane district, which extends across Thane creeks onto the mainland.

History

The word Sasashti (also shortened to Sashti) is Marathi for "sixty-six," referring to the original "sixty-six villages" on the island. It was inhabited by (Aagri, Kunbi) farmers, agriculturists, (Bhandaris) toddy tappers, (Sutar, Malis) artisans, and (Kolis) fisherfolks who trace their conversion to Christianity back to 55 AD with the arrival of Christ's disciple St Bartholomew in north Konkan region. They were later converted to the Latin Church in India by four religious orders—the Dominicans, Franciscans, Augustinians& Jesuits— who arrived in the 15th century with the Portuguese. These original inhabitants of Salsette are the Bombay East Indian Catholics and Kolis.

109 Buddhist caves, including those at Kanheri, can be found on the island, and date from the end of the 2nd century. Salsette was ruled by a succession of Hindu kingdoms, the last of which were the Silharas and later the Marathas. In 1343, the islands were annexed by the Sultan of Guzerat. In 1534, the Portuguese empire seized the islands from Sultan Bahadur Shah. Sashti became part of the northern province of Portuguese India, which was governed from Vasai (Bassein) on the north shore of Bassein Creek. It was leased to Dom (title) Diogo Rodrigues from 25 October, 1535 to 1548. In 1554, the islands were handed over to Garcia de Orta, a renowned physician and botanist and the author of Colloquies on the Simples, Drugs and Materia Medica of India, a seminal work on Indian Eastern medicine of its time.

On the island of Mazagaon, the Jesuits had set up base claiming the land. The Portuguese king refused to entertain their claim and in 1572 permanently leased the island to the de Souza e de Lima family. By now, there was a large Roman Catholic population. The Portuguese also brought with them African slaves known as "Kaffirs", who soon entered the ethnic mix of the people. The Portuguese East Indies had their capital in Old Goa, which lay south of the Bombay islands in India. Goa was then known as the "Rome of the East" due to its prominence, the islands were never important to the Portuguese. Nine churches were built on Salsette island by the Portuguese; Nirmal (1557), Nossa Senhora dos Remédios (1557), Sandor (1566), Agashi (1568), Nandakal (1573), Papdy (1574), Pale (1595), Manickpur (1606) & Nossa Senhora das Mercês (1606). The St. Andrews Church and the Mount Mary's Basilica in Bandra, the Cross at Cross Maidan, Gloria Church (1632) in Mazagaon and the remnants of a church in Santa Cruz are the sole places of worship that have survived till today.

In 1661, the seven Bombay (Mumbai) islets were ceded to Britain as part of the dowry of Catherine Braganza to Charles II of England while Salsette remained in Portuguese hands. Charles II in turn, leased the Bombay islets to the English East India Company in 1668 for £10 per year. The company found the deep harbour at Mumbai (Bombay) eminently apposite, and the population rose from 10,000 in 1661 to 60,000 by 1675. In 1687, the East India Company transferred their headquarters there from Surat. In 1737 the island was captured by the Marathas, all of the Portuguese northern province of Konkan except Damaon, Diu& Silvassa, was frequently invaded by the Maratha navy and army in 1739, Marquis de Pombal formally ceded Greater Bombay to the Peshva ruler of the Maratha Empire in the 1750s.

The British occupied Salsette in 1774, and it was formally ceded to the East India Company in the 1782 Treaty of Salbai. In 1782, William Hornby, then Governor of Bombay Province, initiated the project of connecting the islets of Bombay. By 1845 the seven southern islands had been connected to form South Mumbai, with an area of 435 km². Railway viaducts and causeways were built in the 19th century to connect Bombay Island to the mainland via Salsette. The channels separating Mumbai from Salsette and Trombay were bridged by the Sion Causeway in 1803. Accessibility considerably increased after construction of this causeway. Mahim and Bandra were connected by the Mahim Causeway in 1845. These railway lines and roads encouraged wealthier merchants to build villas on Salsette. By 1901, the population of Salsette had increased to 146,993 and the area began to be referred to as Greater Bombay.

Geography

Salsette is dominated by a central mass of hills surrounded by tidal flats. A number of much smaller islands lay on its western flank. These included Bandra, Khar Danda, Juhu (an old linear sand bar rising above sea level by just a metre or two), Versova, Marve Island, Dharavi Island and Rai Murdhe, all with a knoll core and fringing wave-cut platforms and sandy beaches. These islands seem to have remained separate until as late as 1808. At the time of writing of the old Gazetteer of Thana in 1882, these islands could be reached during low tides by walking across the tidal inlets in between, except for the island of Dharavi in present-day Gorai (not to be confused with the slum near Mahim), which had to be reached by a boat. These are no longer separate, being joined to Salsette via reclamation. The highest point is the conical peak of Kanheri (467 metres) in Borivali National Park on the northern reaches of the island. This national park is the world's biggest within city limits.

Geology
The island is at the confluence of a number of fault lines. This makes the area earthquake-prone, up to a magnitude of 6. The island is mostly composed of black basalt rock. Since it is along the sea coast, it has a sandy belt on its western coast. The southern region of Old Mumbai is mostly at sea level. However, the parts which were erstwhile shallows are below sea level. Many parts of the city are hilly.

There is laterite soil and rocks at a point on Mumbai Island.

Other natural formations

Lakes
There are three major lakes on the island: Powai Lake, Tulsi Lake and Vihar Lake. The latter two supply part of Mumbai's water requirements. Numerous other smaller ponds and lakes are present.

Rivers
The Mithi River (Mahim), Poisar River, Oshiwara River and Dahisar River originate in the national park and empty into the Arabian Sea. The Mithi River originates at Vihar Lake. Vasai and Thane creeks are estuarine distributaries of the Ulhas River.

Creeks
A number of saline or brackish creeks extend inland from the coastline. Mahim Creek separates the city from the suburbs in the west. Further north on the western coast, the Oshiwara river empties into Malad (or Marvé) Creek and the Dahisar River into Gorai Creek. The eastern waterfront also has many small creeks.

Wetlands
The small southern part of the eastern waterfront of Salsette forms Mumbai Harbour.

North of this region lie vast amounts of protected wetlands at Sewree, home to migratory birds. The northern and northwestern part of the island and parts of Mahim River have government-protected marshlands. These swampy regions form massive, dense mangrove forests.

See also

 List of topics on the Portuguese Empire in Goa, Bombay-Bassein, and the East Indies
 Navi Mumbai (New Mumbai)

References 

Geography of Mumbai
Former Portuguese colonies
Islands of Mumbai
Geography of Thane district
Islands of India
Populated places in India